Eucanthus impressus is a species of earth-boring scarab beetle in the family Geotrupidae. It is found in North America.

References

Further reading

 

Geotrupidae
Articles created by Qbugbot
Beetles described in 1964